Charles Holden (12 May 1875 – 1 May 1960) was an English architect best known for designing many London Underground stations during the 1920s and 1930s. Other notable designs were Bristol Central Library, the Underground Electric Railways Company of London's headquarters at 55 Broadway and the University of London's Senate House. Many of his buildings have been granted listed building status, indicating that they are considered to be of architectural or historical interest and protecting them from unapproved alteration. He also designed over 60 war cemeteries and two memorials in Belgium and northern France for the Imperial War Graves Commission from 1920 to 1928.

Holden's early architectural training was in Bolton and Manchester where he worked for architects Everard W. Leeson and Jonathan Simpson before moving to London. After a short period with Arts and Crafts designer Charles Robert Ashbee, he went to work for Henry Percy Adams in 1899. He became Adams' partner in the firm in 1907 and remained with it for the rest of his career.

Buildings

Cemeteries

Memorials

Notes

References

Bibliography
 
 
 
 
 
 

Charles Holden buildings
Holden, Charles
Transport design in London